Gadolinium(III) chloride, also known as gadolinium trichloride, is GdCl3.  It is a colorless, hygroscopic, water-soluble solid. The hexahydrate GdCl3∙6H2O is commonly encountered and is sometimes also called gadolinium trichloride.  Gd3+ species are of special interest because the ion has the maximum number of unpaired spins possible, at least for known elements.  With seven valence electrons and seven available f-orbitals, all seven electrons are unpaired and symmetrically arranged around the metal.  The high magnetism and high symmetry combine to make Gd3+ a useful component in NMR spectroscopy and MRI.

Preparation
GdCl3 is usually prepared by the "ammonium chloride" route, which involves the initial synthesis of (NH4)2[GdCl5].  This material can be prepared from the common starting materials at reaction temperatures of 230 °C from gadolinium oxide:
10 NH4Cl  +  Gd2O3  →  2 (NH4)2[GdCl5]  +  6 NH3  +  3 H2O
 
from hydrated gadolinium chloride:
4 NH4Cl  +  2 GdCl3∙6H2O  →  2 (NH4)2[GdCl5]  +  12 H2O

from gadolinium metal:
10 NH4Cl  +  2 Gd → 2 (NH4)2[GdCl5]  +  6 NH3  +  3 H2

In the second step the pentachloride is decomposed at 300 °C:
 (NH4)2[GdCl5]  →   GdCl3  +  2 NH4Cl
This pyrolysis reaction proceeds via the intermediacy of NH4[Gd2Cl7].

The ammonium chloride route is more popular and less expensive than other methods.  GdCl3 can, however, also be synthesized by the reaction of solid Gd at 600 °C in a flowing stream of HCl.
Gd  +  3 HCl  →  GdCl3  +  3/2 H2

Gadolinium(III) chloride also forms a hexahydrate, GdCl3∙6H2O.  The hexahydrate is prepared by gadolinium(III) oxide (or chloride) in concentrated HCl followed by evaporation.

Structure
GdCl3 crystallizes with a hexagonal UCl3 structure, as seen for other 4f trichlorides including those of La, Ce, Pr, Nd, Pm, Sm, Eu. The following crystallize in theYCl3 motif: DyCl3, HoCl3, ErCl3, TmCl3, YdCl3, LuCl3, YCl3).  The UCl3 motif features 9-coordinate metal with a tricapped trigonal prismatic coordination sphere.  In the hexahydrate of gadolinium(III) chloride and other smaller 4f trichlorides and tribromides, six H2O molecules and 2 Cl− ions coordinate to the cations resulting in a coordination group of 8.

Properties, with applications to MRI
Gadolinium salts are of primary interest for relaxation agents in magnetic resonance imaging (MRI).  This technique exploits the fact that Gd3+ has an electronic configuration of f7.  Seven is the largest number of unpaired electron spins possible for an atom, so Gd3+ is a key component in the design of highly paramagnetic complexes.
To generate the relaxation agents, Gd3+ sources such as GdCl3∙6H2O are converted to coordination complexes.  GdCl3∙6H2O can not be used as an MRI contrasting agent due to its low solubility in water at the body's near neutral pH.  "Free" gadolinium(III), e.g.  [GdCl2(H2O)6]+, is toxic, so chelating agents are essential for biomedical applications.  Simple monodentate or even bidentate ligands will not suffice because they do not remain bound to Gd3+ in solution.  Ligands with higher coordination numbers therefore are required.  The obvious candidate is EDTA4−, ethylenediaminetetraacetate, which is a commonly employed hexadentate ligand used to complex to transition metals.  In lanthanides, however, exhibit coordination numbers greater than six, so still larger aminocarboxylates are employed.

One representative chelating agent is H5DTPA, diethylenetriaminepentaacetic acid.
Chelation to the conjugate base of this ligand increases the solubility of the Gd3+ at the body's neutral pH and still allows for the paramagnetic effect required for an MRI contrast agent.  The DTPA5− ligand binds to Gd through five oxygen atoms of the carboxylates and three nitrogen atoms of the amines.  A 9th binding site remains, which is occupied by a water molecule.  The rapid exchange of this water ligand with bulk water is a major reason for the signal enhancing properties of the chelate.   The structure of [Gd(DTPA)(H2O)]2− is a distorted tricapped trigonal prism.

The following is the reaction for the formation of Gd-DTPA:

References

Gadolinium compounds
Chlorides
Lanthanide halides
Coordination complexes